John O'Shea (1876 - April 29, 1956) was a California impressionist painter known for landscape, marine, figure, and portrait painting. He was one of the major artists in Carmel-by-the-Sea, California between 1917-1945. He was a resident of Carmel for 36 years.

Early life
John O'Shea was born in 1876 in Ballintaylor, near Waterford, in southern Ireland. He was an art student in Dublin and Cork. In 1892, at age 16, he immigrated to the New York City in the United States. He continued his studies at the Adelphi Academy and the Art Students League of New York. He first worked at Tiffany & Company as an engraver.

Career

In 1913, O'Shea moved to Pasadena, California and began his artistic career. He held two showings, one at the Kenneth Avery studio and the other at the Friday Morning Club in Los Angeles. Antony Anderson described his work as "wonderfully beautiful interpretations of our landscape, full of vibrating light and color." Twenty of his paintings were shown at the Friday Morning Club's large auditorium. In 1914, O'Shea painted a canyon with the San Antonio snow-capped mountain in the distance between Mount Lowe and Mount Wilson, Los Angeles County, California.

In 1917, O'Shea relocated to the art colony of Carmel-by-the-Sea. He frequently exhibited at the Carmel Arts and Crafts Club in Carmel.

On May 25, 1922, O'Shea and Mary "Molly" D. Shaughnessy of Terre Haute, Indiana, obtained a marriage license in New York City at the Municipal Building. Their wedding was to take place at a later time. She had inherited  in the Carmel Highlands, California, near Smugglers' Cove. This is where they built a stone mansion, that they named "Tynalacan." Fellow artists,  Theodore Morrow Criley and William Frederic Ritschel were his neighbors. They entertained friends from the area including poet Robinson Jeffers and his wife Una, photographer Edward Weston, and Mabel Loomis Dodge and her husband, Tony Luhan.

 

In the 1920s, O'Shea made trips to Arizona with a close friend and artist Theodore Criley. Paintings from these excursions resulted in art showings in Pasadena, Tucson, and San Francisco.

In 1928, O'Shea and Molly traveled to Tahiti in the South Pacific where he painted landscapes and seascapes. He went to New Mexico in 1930, and painted places around Taos. The New Mexico and Tahiti paintings were exhibited at the Denny-Watrous Gallery in Carmel.

The California Palace of the Legion of Honor in San Francisco, exhibited 36 of his paintings in April and May 1934; as well as the Crocker Art Gallery in Sacramento, California in the 1930s. He also did showings at the Del Monte Art Gallery in the Hotel Del Monte.

In 1938, The O'Shea's moved to Pebble Beach. In November 1939, at the Bay Region Art Association's annual at the Oakland Art Gallery, he won first prize for a watercolor called "Old Trees, Monterey."

His wife died on October 8, 1941, at St. Luke's Hospital in San Francisco after a long illness.

In March 1941, at the California State Fair, he won $570 for the first prize in the category "Decorative" of an oil painting called "Rusty Cypress". He exhibited alongside of Paul Dougherty who won second prize. At the Bohemian Club exhibit in San Francisco, in March 1942, O'Shea gave a one-man-show of his work. He showed a closeup of tropical vegetation, a Hawaiian landscape, and a rocky seascape.

O'Shea was an active member of the Carmel Art Association, serving as President, Director, judge, and exhibitor. He served three terms as president. He designed their front patio and garden area.

Death
On April 29, 1956, O'Shea died at home, at age 80, in a small cottage in Carmel Woods, California. A memorial was held at the Carmel Art Association. Funeral services were held on May 4, at the Little Chapel By the Sea in Pacific Grove.

legacy
O'Shea left a legacy of over 500 works in oil, charcoal, and watercolor.

List of exhibitions
Some of the venues where O'Shea exhibited include the following:

Public collections
Among the public collections holding works by O'Shea are the:

References

External links

 Crocker Art Museum
 Plein Air Painters of California: The Southland by Ruth Lilly Westphal
 Artists in California, 1786-1940 by Edan Milton Hughes
 John O'Shea and Friends: John O'Shea, Burton Shepard Boundary, Theodore Morrow Criley: Carmel Art Association, August 5 through August 31, 1993 Carmel, Calif., 1993. 
 John O'Shea, 1876-1956 The Artist's Life as I Know it, With a complete catalogue of the artist's known works

1876 births
1956 deaths
Irish emigrants to the United States (before 1923)
People from Carmel-by-the-Sea, California
American male painters
American watercolorists
Painters from California
19th-century American painters
19th-century American male artists
20th-century American painters
20th-century American male artists